A banquet hall, function hall, or reception hall, is a special purpose room, or a building, used for hosting large social and business events. Typically a banquet hall is capable of serving dozens to hundreds of people a meal in a timely fashion. People and organizations rent them to hold parties, banquets, wedding receptions, or other social events. Businesses rent them to hold sales meetings, employee training events, employee awards events, and corporate celebrations and parties.

Banquet halls are often found within pubs, nightclubs, hotels, or restaurants. 

The first recorded mention of "function rooms" is in 1922.

They are distinct from other halls, in that they have no religious of government affiliation. Most are run by commercial enterprises, though are run by fraternal organizations and are part of their building, available for rent by the general public, for example Masonic Halls.

Gallery

References

Event management
Rooms